The men's team competition of the racquetball events at the 2015 Pan American Games was held from July 24–26 at the Direct Energy Centre (Exhibition Centre), in Toronto, Canada. Mexico is the defending Men's Team Pan American Games champion.

Schedule

All times are Central Standard Time (UTC-6).

Playoffs

Final standings

References

Racquetball at the 2015 Pan American Games
Racquetball at multi-sport events